Jakub Kania (born December 16, 1990) is a Czech professional ice hockey defenceman. He played with HC Oceláři Třinec in the Czech Extraliga during the 2010–11 Czech Extraliga season.

References

External links

1990 births
Czech ice hockey defencemen
HC Oceláři Třinec players
Living people
SK Horácká Slavia Třebíč players
Podhale Nowy Targ players
ŠHK 37 Piešťany players
HC Frýdek-Místek players
Lausitzer Füchse players
Czech expatriate ice hockey players in Germany
Czech expatriate ice hockey players in Slovakia
Orli Znojmo players
Czech expatriate sportspeople in Poland
Expatriate ice hockey players in Poland
People from Český Těšín
Sportspeople from the Moravian-Silesian Region